Manuel Ortiz Partida (born May 22, 1971) is a Mexican retired professional wrestler who wrestled on the independent circuit in Mexico, particularly in the Tijuana area. He is better known by his stage name Halloween but is also known in the United States as Ciclope, a character he portrayed in World Championship Wrestling from 1996 to 1999.

Professional wrestling career
Manuel Ortiz Partida, debut in the pros in 1990, spent his time in the Independent Circuit. He wrestled as "Halloween" for most of his career. In 1996, Ortiz joined WCW where he took the name "Ciclope". His biggest moment in wrestling was part of the feud between Chris Jericho and Dean Malenko. Malenko, who had been inactive for a few months prior, dressed up as Ciclope to win a Cruiserweight battle royale to determine the number one contendership to Chris Jericho's Cruiserweight Title. Jericho had been refusing to grant Malenko contendership, making the disguise necessary.

After his time there was over, he lost the Ciclope mask to Antifaz del Norte early in 1999. He quickly reverted to his Halloween character but lost his mask again on December 24, 1999 in a match against Super Parka. He has wrestled in many United States promotions over the years including for USA Pro Wrestling, Florida Championship Wrestling (FCW) and Luchamania. In 2002 he along with La Familia de Tijuana (a group consisting of himself, Damián 666, Nicho el Millonario, Rey Misterio, Sr. and their valet Lady Victoria. although Rey did not come for the tour) came to Consejo Mundial de Lucha Libre in Mexico City. The trio won the National Trios title but Nicho had a falling out with management and La Familia soon left entirely. They continued to work for independent promoters until CMLL called them back in 2005 to wrestle against Negro Casas, Heavy Metal and Felino on a show celebrating Negro's 25 years of wrestling. Perro Aguayo, Jr. recruited him and Damián for his Los Perros del Mal group. However, Halloween suffered a leg injury and his role was minimalized. After Universo 2000 used the illegal martinete on Damián 666, Halloween challenged Univeso to a hair vs. hair match on the December 2 show. After losing the match and his hair, Halloween underwent knee surgery that put him out of action for several months after which he was released from CMLL. In 2009 Halloween joined Aguayo's Perros del Mal Producciones, where he reunited with Damián 666. In June 2010, Halloween became a major part of a storyline, where Los Perros del Mal invaded AAA. On June 18, 2011, at Triplemanía XIX, Halloween, Damián 666 and X-Fly defeated Los Psycho Circus in a tournament final to become the first ever AAA World Trios Champions. On July 31 at Verano de Escándalo, Los Perros del Mal faced Los Psycho Circus in a steel cage match, where the last person left in the cage would lose either his hair or mask. The match ended with Psycho Clown escaping the cage, leaving X-Fly inside and forcing him to have his hair shaved off. On October 9 at Héroes Inmortales, Los Perros del Mal and Los Psycho Circus ended their year long rivalry, when Halloween, Damián 666 and Nicho el Millonario were defeated in a Masks vs. Hairs steel cage match and were all shaved bald. After a five-month break from the rivalry, Los Perros del Mal lost the AAA World Trios Championship to Los Psycho Circus on March 11, 2012. The following day, Halloween, Damián 666 and X-Fly announced that they had quit Los Perros del Mal.

On March 13, 2012, Halloween, Bestia 666, Damián 666, Super Nova and X-Fly announced that they were forming La Familia de Tijuana, a group of independent wrestlers, much like Los Perros del Mal, with the exception that they were not looking to form their own promotion. On March 29, International Wrestling Revolution Group (IWRG) was officially announced as La Familia de Tijuanas new home promotion. Afterwards, Halloween was the only member of La Familia de Tijuana, who kept appearing on AAA events. After initially teasing dissension with El Hijo del Perro Aguayo, Halloween reunited with Los Perros del Mal on April 1. On April 19, Halloween officially severed his ties with the rest of La Familia de Tijuana and returned to Los Perros del Mal. On August 5 at Triplemanía XX, Halloween reunited with former partner Extreme Tiger for one night to take part in a Parejas Suicidas steel cage match, featuring three other former tag teams. However, both Halloween and Tiger managed to escape the cage and avoid having to face each other in a Hair vs. Mask match. In late 2012, Halloween started a romance storyline with Mari Apache, which led to the two winning the AAA World Mixed Tag Team Championship on October 7. Later, in the main event of the same evening, Halloween lost his hair to Dark Cuervo in an eight man tag team Domo de la Muerte. Halloween and Apache lost the AAA World Mixed Tag Team Championship to Drago and Faby Apache on July 19, 2013.

Championships and accomplishmentsAAAAAA World Trios Championship (1 time) – with Damián 666 and X-Fly
AAA World Mixed Tag Team Championship (1 time) – with Mari Apache
AAA World Tag Team Championship (1 time) – with Extreme Tiger
Baja California Light Heavyweight Championship (1 time)
IWC Middleweight Championship (1 time)Consejo Mundial de Lucha LibreMexican National Trios Championship (2 times) – with Damián 666 and Psicosis (1) and Damián 666 and Mr. Águila (1)DTU Lucha Profesional MexicanaDTU Consagrado Championship (1 time)Nueva Generacion XtremaNGX World Tag Team Championship (1 time) – with Damián 666Perros del Mal ProduccionesCopa Perros del Mal Extremo (2011)Pro Wrestling IllustratedPWI ranked him # 89 of the 500 best singles wrestlers of the PWI 500 in 2006.Revolution Pro WrestlingRevolution Pro World Tag Team Championship (1 time) – with Damián 666World Wrestling AssociationWWA World Junior Light Heavyweight Championship (1 time)World Wrestling OrganizationWWO Tag Team Championship (1 time) – with Damián 666Xtreme Latin American WrestlingXLAW Tag Team Championship (2 times) – with Damián 666Xtreme Pro WrestlingXPW World Tag Team Championship (2 time) – with Damián 666Other titles':
LAWA World Middleweight Championship (1 time)
WWEA Extreme Championship (1 time)

Luchas de Apuestas record

Footnotes

References

External links
AAA profile
Online World of Wrestling profile

The Latino World Order members
1971 births
Living people
Mexican male professional wrestlers
Professional wrestlers from Baja California
Sportspeople from Tijuana
20th-century professional wrestlers
21st-century professional wrestlers
AAA World Trios Champions
AAA World Tag Team Champions
AAA World Mixed Tag Team Champions
Mexican National Trios Champions
XPW World Tag Team Champions